"It Only Takes a Minute" is a 1975 song by American soul/R&B group Tavares, released as the first single from their third album, In the City (1975). The song was the group's only top-10 pop hit in the United States, peaking at number 10, and their second number one song on the American soul charts. On the US Disco chart, "It Only Takes a Minute" spent five weeks at number two and was the first of four entries on the chart. The song was subsequently covered by Jonathan King performing as 100 Ton and a Feather in 1976 and by boy band Take That in 1992.

Charts
Tavares did not release their original version in the UK until 1986 when it could only reach No 46 in the UK Singles Chart.  It was the last of their ten hits in the UK.

Jonathan King's version peaked at number nine for two weeks in July 1976, and number 10 in Ireland. It would prove to be the last of his six top-10 UK singles in a career that started in 1965 with "Everyone's Gone to the Moon".

Weekly charts
Tavares version

One Hundred Ton and a Feather/Jonathan King version

Year-end charts

Take That version

English boyband Take That recorded a cover of "It Only Takes a Minute" and released it as a single on May 25, 1992, as the fourth single from the band's debut album, Take That & Party (1992). It became the band's first top-10 single, charting at number seven on the UK Singles Chart. A remastered version of Tavares' track is featured in the soundtrack of Konami's dancing game Dance Dance Revolution 3rd Mix. A remix from European producer X-Treme was featured in DDRMAX2: Dance Dance Revolution 7th MIX. The song was performed as conjunction with "Do What U Like" in the Take That Hometown Tour which featured Mini Take That.

In the UK the song has sold 146,000 copies as of March 2017.

Critical reception
Larry Flick from Billboard declared Take That's version of the song as a "light and fluffy rendition of the Tavares disco nugget." He noted further, "Layers of warm harmonies are complemented by reedy horns and an easy-going dance beat. A sugary treat..." Melody Maker felt that "they do for house what their American counterparts [ NKOTB ] did for hip hop." Dave Piccioni from Music Weeks RM Dance Update complimented the "very handy" Tommy Musto remix of the song as "a useful DJ tool that's flying out of the shops." Simon Williams from NME wrote, "'It Only Takes A Minute' took Take That's cunning annexation of the gay club scene into the realm of the anthemic, not to mention hysterical with the line, "If you get a 'flu attack/For 30 days you're on your back!"." Tom Doyle from Smash Hits gave it three out of five, noting that "this sounds exactly like The Village People". He also named it "one of the That's best tunes". A writer for Sunday World stated that this "should be the song which finally breaks Take That".

Music video
A music video was produced to promote the single. It involves the band singing and performing the song at a boxing ring with members Howard Donald, Jason Orange and Mark Owen breakdancing whilst Robbie Williams and Gary Barlow chase after a girl. The video was published on YouTube in October 2009. By November 2020, it has been viewed over 3,8 million times.

Track listings

 UK CD single (74321 10100 2)
 "It Only Takes a Minute" (7-inch version) – 3:50
 "I Can Make It" – 4:12
 "Never Want to Let You Go" – 4:28
 "It Only Takes a Minute" (Deep Club Mix) – 5:43

 UK 7-inch vinyl (74321 10100 7)
 "It Only Takes a Minute" (7-inch version) – 3:50
 "Satisfied" – 4:32

 UK 7-inch vinyl (Limited Edition) (74321 10101 7)
 "It Only Takes a Minute" (7-inch version) – 3:50
 "It Only Takes a Minute" (Royal Rave Mix) – 4:46

 UK 12-inch vinyl (74321 10102 7)
 "It Only Takes a Minute" (Deep Club Mix) – 5:43
 "It Only Takes a Minute" (Wright Vocal Mix) – 6:14
 "It Only Takes a Minute" (Dem Drums) – 5:19
 "It Only Takes a Minute" (Blondapella) – 2:16
 "It Only Takes a Minute" (Love Dub) – 7:11

 UK cassette (74321 10100 4)
 "It Only Takes a Minute" (7-inch version) – 3:50
 "Satisfied" – 4:32

 European CD single (74321 11100 5)
 "It Only Takes a Minute" (7-inch version) – 3:50
 "I Can Make It" – 4:12
 "It Only Takes a Minute" (Wright Vocal Mix) – 6:14
 "It Only Takes a Minute" (Deep Club Mix) – 5:43

 US CD single (TAKE4)
 "It Only Takes a Minute" (7-inch version) – 3:50
 "It Only Takes a Minute" (new remix - radio version) – 3:25

 US 7-inch vinyl (TAKE14)
 "It Only Takes a Minute" (7-inch version) – 3:50
 "It Only Takes a Minute" (new remix - radio version) – 3:25

 US 12-inch vinyl (TAKE214)
 "It Only Takes a Minute" (club version) – 5:43
 "It Only Takes a Minute" (dub version) – 6:14
 "It Only Takes a Minute" (new remix - radio version) – 3:25
 "It Only Takes a Minute" (Underground Vocal) – 6:33
 "It Only Takes a Minute" (Underground Instrumental) – 6:33

 Japanese 3-inch CD single' (TAKEJAP4)
 "It Only Takes a Minute" (7-inch version) – 3:50
 "It Only Takes a Minute" (Wright Vocal Mix) – 6:14

Personnel
 Gary Barlow – lead vocals
 Howard Donald – backing vocals
 Jason Orange – backing vocals
 Mark Owen – backing vocals
 Robbie Williams – backing vocals

Charts

Weekly charts

Year-end charts

References

1975 songs
1975 singles
1986 singles
1992 singles
Tavares (group) songs
Take That songs
Jonathan King songs
Songs written by Brian Potter (musician)
Songs written by Dennis Lambert
Capitol Records singles
Sony Music UK singles